Balladyne Tritsch (born 6 May 1995) is a French professional racing cyclist, who currently rides for UCI Women's Continental Team . In August 2020, she rode in the 2020 La Course by Le Tour de France race.

References

External links
 

1995 births
Living people
French female cyclists
Place of birth missing (living people)
20th-century French women
21st-century French women